List of ports and harbours in Iraq.

Ports
 Abu Flous Port
 Al Başrah Oil Terminal
 Grand faw port
 Khor Al Amaya Oil Terminal
 Khor Al Zubair Port
 Port of Basra
 Umm Qasr Port

Iraq